Rashied Ali, born Robert Patterson (July 1, 1933 – August 12, 2009) was an American free jazz and avant-garde drummer best known for playing with John Coltrane in the last years of Coltrane's life.

Biography

Early life
Patterson was born and raised in Philadelphia, Pennsylvania. His family was musical; his mother sang with Jimmie Lunceford. His brother, Muhammad Ali, is also a drummer, who played with Albert Ayler. Ali, his brother, and his father converted to Islam.

Starting off as a pianist he eventually took up the drums, via trumpet and trombone. He joined the United States Army and played with military bands during the Korean War. After his military service, he returned home and studied with Philly Joe Jones, then toured with Sonny Rollins.

Career
Ali moved to New York in 1963 and worked in groups with Bill Dixon and Paul Bley. He was scheduled to be the second drummer alongside Elvin Jones on John Coltrane's free jazz album Ascension, but he dropped out just before the recording was to take place. Coltrane did not replace him and settled for one drummer. Ali recorded with Coltrane beginning in 1965 on the album Meditations.

Among his credits are the last recorded work by Coltrane (The Olatunji Concert) and Interstellar Space, an album of duets recorded earlier in 1967. Ali "became important in stimulating the most avant-garde kinds of jazz activities," playing what Coltrane described as "multi-directional rhythms". After Coltrane's death, Ali performed with his widow, pianist Alice Coltrane. During the early 1970s, he ran Ali's Alley, a loft club in New York City.

He was a visiting artist at Wesleyan University, sponsored by Clifford Thornton. He also briefly formed a non-jazz group called Purple Trap with Japanese experimental guitarist Keiji Haino and jazz-fusion bassist Bill Laswell. Their album, Decided...Already the Motionless Heart of Tranquility, Tangling the Prayer Called "I", was released by Tzadik Records in March 1999.

In the 1980s, he was member of Phalanx, a group with guitarist James Blood Ulmer, tenor saxophonist George Adams, and bassist Sirone. From 1997 to 2003 he played extensively with Tisziji Munoz in a group that usually included Pharoah Sanders.

Though known for his work in jazz, Ali contributed to other experimental art forms, including multi-media performances with the Gift of Eagle Orchestra and Cosmic Legends, performances such as Devachan and the Monads, Dwarf of Oblivion, which took place at The Kitchen Center for Performance Art, and a tribute to John Cage in New York's Central Park. Other artists of the orchestra and Cosmic Legends have included Hayes Greenfield (sax), Perry Robinson (clarinet), Wayne Lopes (guitar), Dave Douglas (trumpeter), Gloria Tropp (vocals), Louise Landes Levi (sarangi)director/pianist Sylvie Degiez along with poets and actors Ira Cohen, Taylor Mead, and Judith Malina.

Later life
In the last years of his life, Ali led his own quintet. A double album entitled Judgment Day was recorded in February 2005 and features Jumaane Smith on trumpet, Lawrence Clark on tenor saxophone, Greg Murphy on piano, and Joris Teepe on bass. This album was recorded at Ali's own Survival Studio, which has been in existence since the 1970s. In addition to his performance activities Ali served as mentor to young drummers such as Matt Smith.

In 2007, Ali recorded Going to the Ritual in duo with bassist/violinist Henry Grimes with a second duo recording in post-production at the time of Ali's death. Ali and Grimes also played five duo concerts together between 2007 and 2009 and a sixth concert in June 2007 with pianist Marilyn Crispell. Ali is the featured drummer on Azar Lawrence's album Mystic Journey, recorded in April 2009 and released in May 2010.

Rashied Ali died at age 76 in a Manhattan hospital after suffering a heart attack. He is survived by wife Patricia and three children.

Discography

As leader or co-leader
 1971 – New Directions in Modern Music (Survival, reissued by Knit Classics) with Carlos Ward, Fred Simmons, Stafford James
 1972 – Duo Exchange (Survival, reissued by Knit Classics) with Frank Lowe
 1975 – Swift Are the Winds of Life (Survival, reissued by Knit Classics) with Leroy Jenkins
 1973 – Rashied Ali Quintet (Survival, reissued by Knit Classics) with James Blood Ulmer
 1974 – Moon Flight (Knitting Factory)
 1975 – N.Y. Ain't So Bad (Survival, reissued by Knit Classics)
 1989 – Rashied Ali in France (Blue Music Group)
 1994 – Peace on Earth: The Music of John Coltrane (Knitting Factory) with Prima Materia and guests John Zorn, Allan Chase
 1995 – Meditations (Knitting Factory) with Prima Materia, including Greg Murphy
 1995 – Bells (Knitting Factory) with Prima Materia
 1999 – Rings of Saturn (Knitting Factory), duets with tenor saxophonist Louie Belogenis
 1999 – Decided... Already the Motionless Heart of Tranquility, Tangling the Prayer Called "I" (Tzadik) with Purple Trap (Bill Laswell, Keiji Haino, Ali)
 2000 – Live at Tonic (DIW) with Wilber Morris
 2001 – Deals, Ideas & Ideals (Hopscotch) with Peter Kowald and Assif Tsahar
 2001 – No One in Particular (Survival) with Rashied Ali Quintet
 2006 – Judgment Day Vol. 1 (Survival) with Rashied Ali Quintet
 2006 – Judgment Day Vol. 2 (Survival) with Rashied Ali Quintet
 2008 – Going to the Ritual (Porter) with bassist Henry Grimes
 2009 – At the Vision Festival with Greg Tardy, James Hurt, Omer Avital (Blue Music Group)
 2009 – Eddie Jefferson at Ali's Alley with Eddie Jefferson (Blue Music Group)
 2009 – Configurations, the Music of John Coltrane with Prima Materia (Blue Music Group)
 2009 – Cutt'n Korners with Greg Tardy, Antoine Drye and Abraham Burton (Blue Music Group)
 2009 – Live in Europe (Survival) with Rashied Ali Quintet
 2010 – Spirits Aloft (Porter) with bassist Henry Grimes
 2020 – First Time Out: Live at Slugs 1967 (Survival) with Rashied Ali Quintet

As sideman
With Gary Bartz
Home! (Milestone, 1970)

With Peter Brötzmann
Songlines (FMP, 1994)

With Michael Bocian
Go Groove (1991)

With Marion Brown
Marion Brown Quartet (1966)
Why Not? (1968)

With Alice Coltrane
A Monastic Trio (1968)
Huntington Ashram Monastery (1969)
Journey in Satchidananda (1970)
Universal Consciousness (1971)

With John Coltrane
Meditations (Impulse!, 1965)
Live at the Village Vanguard Again! (Impulse!, 1966)
Live in Japan (Impulse!, 1966)
Offering: Live at Temple University (Resonance, 1966)
Interstellar Space (Impulse!, 1967)
Stellar Regions  (Impulse!, 1967)
Expression (Impulse!, 1967)
The Olatunji Concert: The Last Live Recording (Impulse!, 1967)
Cosmic Music (Impulse!, 1968)
With Charles Gayle
Touchin' on Trane (FMP, 1991 [1993])

With Jackie McLean
'Bout Soul (Blue Note, 1967)

With Tisziji Munoz
The River of Blood (Anami Music, 1997)
Present Without A Trace (Anami Music, 1997)
Spirit World (Anami Music, 1997)
Presence of Truth (Anami Music, 1999)
Presence of Joy (Anami Music, 1999)
Presence of Mastery (Anami Music, 1999)
Breaking the Wheel of Life and Death (Anami Music, 2000)
Parallel Reality (Anami Music, 2000)
The Hu-Man Spirit (Anami Music, 2001)
Shaman-Bala (Anami Music, 2002)
Divine Radiance (Anami Music, 2003)
Divine Radiance Live! (Anami Music, 2013)
Paul Shaffer Presents: Tisziji Muñoz – Divine Radiance Live! DVD (Anami Music, 2013)
Sky Worlds (Anami Music, 2014)

With David Murray
Body and Soul (1993)

With Phalanx
Original Phalanx (DIW, 1987)
In Touch (DIW, 1988)

With Henry Rollins
Everything (Thirsty Ear, 1996)

With Archie Shepp
 On This Night (Impulse, 1965)

With Alan Shorter
 Orgasm (Verve, 1968; reissued in 1969 as Parabolic)

With James Blood Ulmer
Music Speaks Louder Than Words (DIW, 1996)

With Frank Wright
Blues for Albert Ayler (ESP-Disk, 2012)

References

External links
 Official site

1933 births
2009 deaths
African-American drummers
African-American Muslims
American jazz drummers
Converts to Islam
DIW Records artists
Free jazz drummers
Musicians from New York City
United States Army soldiers
20th-century American drummers
American male drummers
Jazz musicians from New York (state)
American male jazz musicians
21st-century American drummers
Phalanx (band) members
20th-century American male musicians
21st-century American male musicians
20th-century African-American musicians
21st-century African-American musicians
FMP/Free Music Production artists